The Max Delbruck Prize, formerly known as the Biological physics prize, is awarded by the Division of Biological Physics of the American Physical Society, to recognize and encourage outstanding achievement in biological physics research. The prize was established in 1981, and renamed for Max Delbrück in 2006. The award consists of $10,000, an allowance for travel to the meeting where the prize is awarded, and a certificate. It was presented biennially in even-numbered years until 2014, and will be presented annually starting 2015.

Past winners
Source: American Physical Society
 2020: James Collins

 2019: Jose Nelson Onuchic, Ken A. Dill

 2018: William S. Bialek, Princeton University

 2017: , Los Alamos National Laboratory

 2016: Stephen R. Quake, Stanford University

 2015: Stanislas Leibler, Rockefeller University

 2014: Robert Austin
 2012: William Eaton
 2010: Xiaowei Zhuang
 2008: Steven Block
 2006: 
 2004: Peter Wolynes
 2002: Carlos Bustamante
 2000: Paul K. Hansma
 1998: Rangaswamy Srinivasan
 1996: Seiji Ogawa
 1994: , 
 1992: Hans Frauenfelder
 1991: Watt W. Webb
 1987: Britton Chance
 1986: Hartmut Michel and Johann Deisenhofer
 1985: John Hopfield
 1984: Howard Berg and Edward Purcell
 1983: Paul Lauterbur
 1982: George Feher,

See also
List of biology awards
List of physics awards
List of prizes named after people

References

External links
 

Awards established in 1981
Awards of the American Physical Society
Biophysics awards
Fellows of the American Physical Society